Fredericksburg Baptist Church is a historic church founded in 1804 and located in the historic district of downtown Fredericksburg, Virginia.

History
Founded in 1804, under the name of Shiloh and with origins dating back to the 18th century, Fredericksburg Baptist Church is one of a few historical churches located in the Fredericksburg Historic District.

Its first pastor was Andrew B. Broaddus (1770–1848) of Caroline County, Virginia, who was a renowned minister of his day and "declared the most eloquent man that ever spoke within the walls of the Capitol]."

See also
Shiloh Baptist Church (Old Site)
Shiloh Baptist Church (Washington, D.C.)

References

External links
Fredericksburg Baptist Church

Churches in Fredericksburg, Virginia
1804 establishments in Virginia
19th-century Baptist churches in the United States
Baptist churches in Virginia